

I
 

Ib-Im

 
 
 
 
 
 
 
 
 
 
 
  (/)
  (/)
 
  (/)
 
  (/)
  (/)
  (/)
 
 

In

  (/)
 
 
 
  (/)
  (/)
  (/, /)
  ( stone fleet)
 
  (/)
 
 
 
  (/)
  (1778)
 
 
 
 
  (/)
 
 
  (/)
 
 
  (/)
 
 
 
 
  (/)
  (/)
 
 
  (//)
  (/)
  (/)
 
  (/)
  (/)

Io-Iz

 
 
  (//)
 
 
 
  (/)
 
 
  (/)
 
 
 
  (/)
 
 
 
 
 
 
 
 
 
 
  (/)
 
 
 
 
 
 
 
 
 
 
 
  (/)
  (//)
 
 
 
  (/, /)
  (/)
  (/)
 
 

J

 
 
 
 
 
  (/)
  (/)
 
 
 
 
 
 
 
 
  (//)
 

Ja

 
  (/)
 
 
  (/)
 
 
 
 
 
  (/)
 
 
 
 
 Jacona (YFP-1)
 
 
 
  (//)
 
 
 
 
 
 
  (1881)
 
 
  (/)
 
  (///)
 
 
  (/)
 
 
 
 
  (/, /)
 
 
 
 
 
 
  (/, /)
 
 
 
 
 

Je-Ji

 
 
 
 
 
 
  (/)
 
 
 
  (/)
  (/)
  (/)
 
 
 
 
 
 
 
  (//)
 
 
 
  (/)
 
 

Jo

 
 
 
 
 
 
 
 
  (/)
 
 
 
 
 
 
  (/)
 
 
 
 
 
  (1874)
  (/)
 
 
 
 
 
 
 
 
 
 
 
 
  (//)
 
 
 
 
 
 
 
 
 
 
 
 
 
  (/)
 
 
 
  (/)
 
 
 
  (/)
 
  (/)
  (/)
 
 
 
 
  (//)
 
 
 
 
 
 
 
 
 
 
 
 USNS Johnstown  (AGM-20)
  (IX-532)
 
 
 
  (/)
 
 
  (/)
 
 
  (//)
 
 
  (/)
 
 
 
  (/)
 
 
 
  (/)
 
 
  (/)
 
 
  (/)

Ju

  (/)
 
 
 
 USS Julia Hamilton (SP-1460)
 
 
 
  (/)
  (/)
  (//)
  (/)
 
 
  (1903)
  (/)
 
 

K

 
 
 
 
 
 
 
 
 

Ka

  (/)
  (////)
 
 
 
  (//)
 
 
 
  (//)
 
 
  (/)
 
  (/)
 
 
 
 
 
 
  (/)
 
  (/)
 
 
 
 
 
 
 
 
  (//)
 
  (//)
 
 
 
 
 
 
 
  (/)
 
 
 
 
 
 
 
 

Ke

 
  (/, //)
 
 
 
 
 
 
 
 
 
  (/)
  (/)
 
 
 
  (/)
 
 
 
  (/)
 
 
 
 
  (/)
 
 
 
 
  (///)
  (/)
 
  (/)
  (/)
 
 
 
 
 
 
 
  (/)
 
 
 
 
 
  (//)
  (/, /)
 
 
 
  (/)
  (/)
  (//)
 
  (/)
 
 
  (/)

Kh-Ki

  
 
  (/)
 
  (/)
 
  (/)
 
  (/)
 
 
 RV Kilo Moana (T-AGOR-26) (Operated by the University of Hawaii)
  (//)
 
 
  (//)
  (/)
 
  (/, /)
 
  (//)
  (/)
  (/)
 
 
 
 
 
 
  (/)
  (/)
  (/)
  (/)
  (//)
 
  (/)
  (/)
  (//)
 
 
  (//)
 
 
 
  (/, /)

Kl-Ky

 
 
 
  (/)
 
  (/)
  (/)
 
  (/)
 
  (/)
 RV Knorr (Operated by Woods Hole Oceanographic Institution)
  (/, /)
 
  (/)
  (//)
 
 
  (/)
 
  (//)
 
 
  (//)
  (/)
 
 
  (//)
 
 
 
  (/)
 
 
  (//)
 
 

References
 Dictionary of American Naval Fighting Ships, I
  Naval Vessel Register, I
 navy.mil: List of homeports and their ships
 NavSource Naval History